Gabriel dela Cruz Singson (18 March 1929 – 29 March 2016) was lawyer and banker, who served as the first Governor of the Bangko Sentral ng Pilipinas (BSP) from 1993 to 1999. He was the first Governor of the BSP after former President Fidel V. Ramos signed the Republic Act 7653, otherwise known as New Central Bank Act, into law in 1993.

Early life
Singson was born on March 18, 1929, in the town of Lingayen, Pangasinan.

Career
Singson has also served different executive positions of various companies. He was the recipient of the 1998 Management Man of the Year conferred by the Management Association of the Philippines.

Personal life
He was married to Moonyeen Singson with 3 children: Carissa Singson-Mabasa, Gabriel Singson Jr. and Gerard Singson.

Death
He died at the age of 87 on March 29, 2016.

References

1929 births
2016 deaths
Ateneo de Manila University alumni
Governors of the Bangko Sentral ng Pilipinas
People from Pangasinan
Filipino bankers
20th-century Filipino lawyers
Estrada administration personnel
Ramos administration personnel
20th-century Filipino businesspeople